Fourth-seeded Frank Sedgman defeated John Bromwich 6–3, 6–2, 6–2 in the final to win the men's singles tennis title at the 1949 Australian Championships.

Seeds
The seeded players are listed below. Frank Sedgman is the champion; others show the round in which they were eliminated.

 John Bromwich (finalist)
 Bill Sidwell (semifinals)
 Geoffrey Brown (semifinals)
 Frank Sedgman (champion)
 Adrian Quist (quarterfinals)
 Colin Long (quarterfinals)
 George Worthington (quarterfinals)
 Jack Crawford (third round)

Draw

Key
 Q = Qualifier
 WC = Wild card
 LL = Lucky loser
 r = Retired

Finals

Earlier rounds

Section 1

Section 2

Section 3

Section 4

External links
 

1949
1949 in Australian tennis